Kalib Starnes (born January 6, 1975) is a Canadian mixed martial artist.

Early life 
Starnes became involved in the martial arts at an early age and began teaching when he was a teenager. He started training in Gracie Jiu-Jitsu at the Gracie Academy in 1994 in Torrance, California. And has also practiced Muay Thai, Boxing, Judo, Aikido, Kung Fu, Taekwondo, Greco Roman Wrestling, Shotokan and Wado Ryu Karate.

Mixed martial arts career

Ultimate Fighting Championship
Starnes made his UFC debut on June 24, 2006 at the finale of The Ultimate Fighter 3, winning via rear naked choke over Danny Abbadi.

After this Starnes would gain the biggest victory in his career, by defeating Chris Leben on May 26, 2007 at UFC 71 via unanimous decision, also winning the Fight of The Night bonus for his efforts.

During the UFC 64 event, Starnes suffered a third-round TKO to Yushin Okami.

In his final UFC bout, he lost via unanimous decision to Nate Quarry at UFC 83 in Montreal Canada. Starnes was criticized by MMA pundits and fans for avoiding Quarry for the majority of the match, leading to a new nickname, "The Running Man." Many speculate that his poor performance in this fight was one of the main reasons he was released by the UFC.

Championships and accomplishments
Ultimate Fighting Championship
 Fight of the Night (One time) vs. Chris Leben
Armageddon Fighting Championship
AFC Middleweight Champion (One time)
Fight of the Night (One time)
Destiny MMA
Destiny MMA Light Heavyweight Championship (One time)

Mixed martial arts record 

|-
|Loss
| align=center| 17–11–1
| Tim Hague
| TKO (leg kick)
| XFFC 9: Conviction
|
| align=center| 4
| align=center| 0:13
| Grande Prairie, Alberta, Canada
|
|-
| Win
| align=center| 17–10–1
| Craig Hudson
| Submission (rear-naked choke)
| XFFC 7: Bad Blood
| 
| align=center| 2
| align=center| 4:31
| Grande Prairie, Alberta, Canada
|
|-
| Loss
| align=center| 16–10–1
| Rodney Wallace
| Decision (split)
| HKFC: Hard Knocks 44
| 
| align=center| 3
| align=center| 5:00
| Calgary, Alberta, Canada
| 
|-
| Loss
| align=center| 16–9–1
| Dave Herman
| Decision (unanimous)
|  Titan FC 28: Brilz vs. Davis
| 
| align=center| 3
| align=center| 5:00
| Newkirk, Oklahoma, United States
| 
|-
| Win
| align=center| 16–8–1
| Dwayne Lewis
| KO (elbow)
| WSOF 7
| 
| align=center| 2
| align=center| 1:02
| Vancouver, British Columbia, Canada
| 
|-
| Win
| align=center| 15–8–1
| Clay Davidson
| TKO (punches)
| Fivestar Fight League 8: Barefoot Beach Battle
| 
| align=center| 1
| align=center| 1:21
| Penticton, British Columbia, Canada
| 
|-
| Win
| align=center| 14–8–1
| Tim Hague
| Decision (unanimous)
| AFC 19: Undisputed
| 
| align=center| 3
| align=center| 5:00
| Edmonton, Alberta, Canada
| 
|-
| Win
| align=center| 13–8–1
| David Perron
| TKO (punches)
| AFC 18: Mayhem
| 
| align=center| 2
| align=center| 4:05
| Victoria, British Columbia, Canada
| 
|-
| Loss
| align=center| 12–8–1
| Joe Doerksen
| Decision (unanimous)
| AFC 11: Takeover
| 
| align=center| 3
| align=center| 5:00
| Winnipeg, Manitoba, Canada
| 
|-
| Loss
| align=center| 12–7–1
| John Salter
| KO (punches)
| AFC 6: Conviction
| 
| align=center| 2
| align=center| 4:13
| Victoria, British Columbia, Canada
| 
|-
| Loss
| align=center| 12–6–1
| Patrick Côté
| Decision (unanimous)
| Ringside 10: Cote vs. Starnes
| 
| align=center| 3
| align=center| 5:00
| Montreal, Quebec, Canada
| 
|-
| Win
| align=center| 12–5–1
| Matt MacGrath
| Submission (rear-naked choke)
| Wreck MMA: Strong and Proud
| 
| align=center| 2
| align=center| 3:14
| Gatineau, Quebec, Canada
| 
|-
| Win
| align=center| 11–5–1
| Nick Hinchliffe
| Submission (armbar)
| AFC 3: Evolution
| 
| align=center| 1
| align=center| 3:49
| Victoria, British Columbia, Canada
| 
|-
| Loss
| align=center| 10–5–1
| Falaniko Vitale
| Submission (ezekiel choke)
| X-1 - Champions 2
| 
| align=center| 1
| align=center| 2:22
| Hawaii, United States
| 
|-
| Win
| align=center| 10–4–1
| Marcus Hicks
| Submission (rear-naked choke)
| AFC 2: Aftershock
| 
| align=center| 1
| align=center| 1:22
| Victoria, British Columbia, Canada
| 
|-
| Loss
| align=center| 9–4–1
| Hector Lombard
| Submission (punches)
| Cage Fighting Championships 11
| 
| align=center| 1
| align=center| 1:55
| Sydney, New South Wales, Australia
| 
|-
| Win
| align=center| 9–3–1
| Chris Cisneros
| Submission (armbar)
| Destiny MMA: Pier Fighter 1
| 
| align=center| 2
| align=center| 4:47
| Honolulu, Hawaii, United States
| 
|-
| Loss
| align=center| 8–3–1
| Nate Quarry
| Decision (unanimous)
| UFC 83
| 
| align=center| 3
| align=center| 5:00
| Montreal, Quebec, Canada
| 
|-
| Loss
| align=center| 8–2–1
| Alan Belcher
| TKO (doctor stoppage)
| UFC 77
| 
| align=center| 2
| align=center| 1:39
| Cincinnati, Ohio, United States
| 
|-
| Win
| align=center| 8–1–1
| Chris Leben
| Decision (unanimous)
| UFC 71
| 
| align=center| 3
| align=center| 5:00
| Las Vegas, Nevada, United States
| 
|-
| Loss
| align=center| 7–1–1
| Yushin Okami
| TKO (punches)
| UFC 64: Unstoppable
| 
| align=center| 3
| align=center| 1:40
| Las Vegas, Nevada, United States
| 
|-
| Win
| align=center| 7–0–1
| Danny Abbadi
| Submission (rear-naked choke)
| The Ultimate Fighter: Team Ortiz vs. Team Shamrock Finale
| 
| align=center| 1
| align=center| 2:56
| Las Vegas, Nevada, United States
| 
|-
| Win
| align=center| 6–0–1
| Jason MacDonald
| TKO (punches)
| National Fighting Challenge 5
| 
| align=center| 1
| align=center| 4:37
| North Vancouver, British Columbia, Canada
| 
|-
| Win
| align=center| 5–0–1
| Mike Yackulic
| TKO (submission to punches)
| World Freestyle Fighting 9: Wild West
| 
| align=center| 1
| align=center| 2:21
| Vancouver, British Columbia, Canada
| 
|-
| Win
| align=center| 4–0–1
| Jason Zazelenchuk
| Submission (rear-naked choke)
| National Fighting Challenge 3
| 
| align=center| 1
| align=center| 0:42
| Vancouver, British Columbia, Canada
| 
|-
| Win
| align=center| 3–0–1
| Gerry Elliot
| Submission (arm-triangle choke)
| World Freestyle Fighting 8: Dominance
| 
| align=center| 1
| align=center| N/A
| Vancouver, British Columbia, Canada
| 
|-
| Win
| align=center| 2–0–1
| Ramin Astaseare
| TKO (punches)
| National Fighting Challenge 2
| 
| align=center| 1
| align=center| 1:49
| Vancouver, British Columbia, Canada
| 
|-
| Win
| align=center| 1–0–1
| Wayne Atkinson
| Submission (rear-naked choke)
| Adrenaline Fighting Championships 1
| 
| align=center| 1
| align=center| 2:22
| Langley, British Columbia, Canada
| 
|-
| Draw
| align=center| 0–0–1
| Leonard Carter
| Draw
| Ultimate Warrior Challenge
| 
| align=center| 1
| align=center| N/A
| Vancouver, British Columbia, Canada
|

Mixed martial arts exhibition record

|-
| Loss
| align=center| 1–1
| Kendall Grove
| Verbal submission (rib injury)
| The Ultimate Fighter 3
| 
| align=center| 3
| align=center| 0:30
| Las Vegas, Nevada
| 
|-
| Win
| align=center| 1–0
| Mike Stine
| KO (punches)
| The Ultimate Fighter 3
| 
| align=center| 1
| align=center| 2:09
| Las Vegas, Nevada
|

See also
 List of male mixed martial artists
 List of Canadian UFC fighters

References

External links 

 

1975 births
Canadian wushu practitioners
Canadian male taekwondo practitioners
Canadian aikidoka
Canadian male karateka
Canadian male judoka
Canadian male mixed martial artists
Middleweight mixed martial artists
Mixed martial artists utilizing wushu
Mixed martial artists utilizing taekwondo
Mixed martial artists utilizing aikido
Mixed martial artists utilizing karate
Mixed martial artists utilizing judo
Mixed martial artists utilizing Brazilian jiu-jitsu
Living people
Sportspeople from Surrey, British Columbia
Ultimate Fighting Championship male fighters
Canadian practitioners of Brazilian jiu-jitsu